The Council for the Development of Social Science Research in Africa (CODESRIA) is Pan-African research organisation headquartered in Dakar, Senegal. The current President of CODESRIA is Dzodzi Tsikata.

Background
CODESRIA  was established in 1973. Its aim is to promote, facilitate and disseminate research (within the social sciences) throughout Africa and also to create a community in which members can work without barriers regarding language, country, age or gender. While CODESRIA is an active research organization it does not abstain from serving as a platform for political statements. Unlike many other organizations it does not agree with the traditional division of Africa in the social sciences where North Africa is often more or less left out, instead, it tries to equally represent the 5 regions in Africa (North Africa, East Africa, Central Africa, West Africa and South Africa). To achieve their mission CODESRIA cooperates with African institutes (e.g.: ERNWACA, FSS) and non-African institutes and organizations (e.g.: the ASC and the NAI). Funding is obtained through various donors ranging from the Dutch and Danish Foreign Ministries, the Senegalese Government, the Ford Foundation to the United Nations. In 1997 the organisation received one of the Prince Claus Awards.
CODESRIA has three governing organs, the General Assembly being the highest, followed by the Executive Committee (headed by Sam Moyo) and the Scientific Committee (headed by Takyiwaa Manuh), each with their own specific roles.

Contributions to Social Sciences
CODESRIA grants scholarships. These grants comprise all levels from MA to post-doctoral research, organizes conferences and programs focusing on issues related to the social sciences and humanities, publishes in various forms (also see publications) and helps in setting up research training. Within the CODESRIA environment different strains of thought can be discerned, namely an older, more Marxist oriented group and a younger, neo-liberal group. A third group is characterized by people active in women studies and civil movements. Most of the programs offered to people are however dominated by men with the exception of the gender institute (2007 figures).

Publications
Journals
Africa Development
African Sociological Review
African Journal of International Affairs
Afrika Zamani
Identity, Culture and Politics: an Afro-Asian Dialogue
CODESRIA Bulletin
Journal of Higher Education in Africa
Africa Review of Books (started 2005)
The ARB is published twice yearly in English and in French. It is piloted by both the Forum for Social Studies (FSS), and the National centre of research in social and cultural anthropology (CRASC).
Africa Media Review
Afro-Arab Selections for Social Sciences

Online Publications
Africa Development
African Sociological Review
Afrika Zamani
Identity, Culture and Politics : an Afro-Asian Dialogue
Monographs on line

References

External links

Organizations established in 1973
1973 establishments in Senegal
International research institutes
African studies
Organisations based in Dakar
Academic journals published in Africa
Members of the International Science Council